The Neon Museum in Las Vegas, Nevada, United States, features signs from old casinos and other businesses displayed outdoors on 2.62 acres. The museum features a restored lobby shell from the defunct La Concha Motel as its visitors' center, which officially opened on October 27, 2012.

For many years, the Young Electric Sign Company (YESCO) stored many of these old signs in their "boneyard." The signs were slowly being destroyed by exposure to the elements.

The signs are considered by Las Vegas locals, business owners and government organizations to be not only artistically, but also historically, significant to the culture of the city. Each of the restored signs in the collection holds a story about who created it and why it is important.

History
The Neon Museum was founded in 1996 as a partnership between the Allied Arts Council of Southern Nevada and the City of Las Vegas. Today, it is an independent 501(c)3 non-profit. Located on Las Vegas Boulevard N., the Neon Museum includes the Neon Boneyard and the North Gallery.

The impetus behind the collecting of signs was the loss of the iconic sign from The Sands; after it was replaced with a new sign in the 1980s. There was no place to store the massive sign, and it was scrapped. After nearly 10 years of collecting signs, the Allied Arts Council of Southern Nevada and the city of Las Vegas worked together to create an institution to house and care for the saved signs. To mark its official opening in November 1996, the Neon Museum restored and installed the Hacienda Horse & Rider sign at the intersection of Las Vegas Boulevard and Fremont Street. However, access to the collection was provided by appointment only. Annual attendance was approximately 12–20,000 during this time. 

In 2005, the historic La Concha lobby was donated to the museum by owners of the La Concha Motel, the Doumani family. Although it cost nearly $3 million to move and restore the La Concha, the plans to open a museum became concrete after the donation of the building, drawing a number of public and private grants and donations. In total, approximately $6.5 million was raised for the visitors' center, headquarters, a new park, and restoration of 15 major signs.

In November 2009, the Neon Museum restored and installed the famous Silver Slipper sign across from its welcome center, and two more restored vintage signs were installed near the northern end of Las Vegas Boulevard to mark its designation as a National Scenic Byway.

Paid public admission commenced on October 27, 2012, replacing the prior appointment-only basis. Attendance during the first year was 60,461, exceeding the early estimate of 45–50,000 visitors.

After outgrowing its space in the former La Concha lobby shell, the museum moved its headquarters to old City Hall in 2016 and converted the offices into a museum store. In 2017, the museum purchased land for its first expansion since opening to the public in 2012. For its fifth anniversary, the Neon Museum offered free admission on October 28, 2017. In 2018, the Neon Museum administrative staff moved again to a space on the campus of the Las Vegas-Review Journal and opened a programming space there called Ne10 Studio.

Exhibits
The Neon Museum is located on Las Vegas Boulevard, south of the Cashman Center and within the Las Vegas Cultural Corridor. The museum has exhibits in three main areas: restored and installed neon signs along the median of Las Vegas Blvd (between Fremont St. and Washington Ave.), the Neon Boneyard, and the museum's North Gallery.

Restored signs

The Neon Museum maintains several restored signs throughout Downtown Las Vegas and along the Las Vegas Strip. The cost of restoring signs is estimated to range from $10,000 for small pieces to $100,000 for the largest signs.

Boneyard Park
The Neon Boneyard Park was created in 2012, with "NEON" spelled out using letters shaped like those on signs for the Golden Nugget ("N"), Caesars Palace ("E"), Binion's Horseshoe ("O"), and Desert Inn ("N"). The letters are set on a grid inspired by the sign for The Sands, and the sign is decorated with stars like those from the Stardust and a starburst like the Welcome to Fabulous Las Vegas sign designed by Betty Willis.

Main Boneyard
The majority of the Neon Museum's collection is displayed within the Main Boneyard. Pieces in this boneyard include signage from the Stardust, Riviera, Desert Inn and Caesars Palace as well as many others. The Neon Museum also houses fiberglass sculptures including a giant skull from the Treasure Island Hotel and Casino. This is also where the functioning restored signs within the museum's collection are housed.

North Gallery
In 2018, the Neon Museum began Brilliant!, a 30-minute art installation designed by Craig Winslow which uses multiple projectors to reanimate defunct signs, set to vintage and contemporary music.

See also
Lost Vegas: Tim Burton

References

External links

 
 
 

Museums in Las Vegas
Downtown Las Vegas
Art museums and galleries in Nevada
Neon lighting
Signage
Art museums established in 1996
1996 establishments in the United States
Mass media museums in the United States